NQAF may refer to:

 National Quality Assurance Framework, used in several contexts
 National Queer Arts Festival
 North Queensland Amenities Fund